Dragan Gagić (born 9 December 1935) is a Serbian gymnast. He competed in eight events at the 1960 Summer Olympics.

References

1935 births
Living people
Serbian male artistic gymnasts
Olympic gymnasts of Yugoslavia
Gymnasts at the 1960 Summer Olympics
Sportspeople from Belgrade